Lördagsgodis is a Swedish tradition of children eating sweets (candy) on a Saturday.

The tradition started as a health recommendation in 1959 following the government-funded Vipeholm experiments, where patients of Vipeholm Hospital for the intellectually disabled in Lund, Sweden, were unknowingly fed large amounts of sweets to see whether a high-sugar diet would make their teeth decay.

Over time, it has become more like a routine for both children and adults to eat candy on Saturdays. Something that you can look forward to at the weekends. It is common for Swedes to buy lördagsgodis from candy walls in grocery stores. However, many children in Sweden also eat sweets on other occasions, but Saturday is still known as the big candy day of the week.

References 

Swedish culture